"Lose the Boss" is an episode from the dramedy series Ugly Betty, which aired on November 23, 2006. In the United States, Canada and Australia, it is the ninth episode but it's the tenth overall and was written by Oliver Goldstick and directed by Ken Whittingham. This episodes's title is a pun on a former ABC sitcom, Who's the Boss?, which starred Judith Light, who became a regular on this series.

Plot

It's the day after Thanksgiving. Betty finds Daniel Meade, fully naked in bed with just his black socks and black underwear on. He reminds him that she picked him up drunk in a bar last night. When he asks her where she slept, her answer was 'In your arms,' but she's just teasing; she actually slept on the couch. He bitterly tells her that Sofia ran away with her perfect boyfriend and 'his perfect chin' (aka Hunter, her fiancé). She tries to reassure him that a lot can change in a short time and tucks him back into bed. Betty goes downstairs and tells her father to be nice to Daniel when he wakes up. Another surprise guest, Santos, walks into the kitchen in a kimono and Ignacio says he liked it better when he sneaked out in the middle of the night. Daniel eventually comes down and tries to leave quietly, but Ignacio finds him and pulls him into the kitchen. Santos begins to compliment Daniel on his publicized history with the ladies before Ignacio brings Daniel a plate of food that sends him running to the bathroom.

Meanwhile, back at MODE, Wilhelmina is going through the litany of destructions that befell her office to Marc. He tried to pretend that he was in Schenectady on Thanksgiving, but she knows that it was him after she discovered the 15 grams of fat left behind in the form of a cashew Amanda dropped. However that issue would be put aside when Bradford calls to tell Wilhelmina to turn on Fashion TV where they see Isaac Mizrahi reporting on an elusive sought-after couple. Bradford then tells her that they've been chosen to reveal 'baby Chutney' (the newborn of celebrity couple Tim and Chloe) to the world for the first time.

Betty walks into the office and finds Sofia leaving a note for Daniel; he hasn't been calling her back. She begins to go on about her marriage plans with Hunter before confessing to Betty that she isn't sure anymore, but would Daniel even care? Betty tries to feign disinterest and they return to work.

Bradford comes down looking for Daniel, worried about the photo shoot for Tim and Chloe's baby. Sofia has offered to do the writing. Betty calls Daniel, still mildly drunk and mollycoddled on the sofa by Justin and Ignacio. He tells Betty that he is not going anywhere and he's having a Christmas tree delivered to her family. Betty begins to wonder how she will get this shoot taken care of. While Justin starts to tell Daniel about issues of MODE he's saved, Ignacio slips away to ask Hilda how long she thinks Santos will stay this time, now that Hilda and Santos had their night of lovemaking.

Back at MODE, Bruno the stylist arrives with Amanda. He tries to fob Betty off while she makes excuses for Daniel. He demands coffee and starts explaining his concept to Amanda. Meanwhile, Wilhelmina and Marc are driving around town worrying about the shoot. Marc sends Amanda a message that Wilhelmina knows all about their secret romp; Amanda scarfs down a croissant. Amanda then sends Marc a text message back which obviously outs him as the culprit even though Wilhelmina is unaware it was Amanda who answered the phone (she took Marc's phone from him after seeing the text, then threw it out the window). He begins to wheeze while Wilhelmina demands to know why he was calling the hospital. But just as she was about give Marc the grilling the car gets a flat while Marc hyperventilates.

Betty continues trying to call Daniel while Sofia tries to get information out of Betty about him. Bruno starts to go through a series of baby outfits before deciding on a chain mail outfit. Betty questions the choice, but he says he won't take critiques from someone who trims her bangs with a lighter. Meanwhile, Daniel goes through the homemade ornaments of Betty's family while they decorate the tree. They ask him to hang an ornament but he isn't sure how; he was never allowed to touch the Christmas tree growing up.

Later on in the day, Christina tries to sort out a costume for the baby while Betty calls Daniel again. He's enjoying decorating her tree; it was just a photo opportunity in his family. He tells her that she should look after things; she always wants more responsibility. The designer then goes into a panic. He just received a photo of the baby and it's hideous. Betty says that maybe he's not the right person for the job if he doesn't think he can find something beautiful in a baby. He tells her she should find someone who designs installations for the zoo and storms out. On the way out, he asks Sofia who she was. Sofia answers 'Today, she's the boss'. Sofia offers to help Betty, but Betty explains that Daniel's heart is broken and he's drunk himself sick. Amanda then walks in and announces that 'team Baby Chutney has arrived and is waiting.'

Across town, Wilhelmina and Marc decide to go grab a cab. As they do, Marc tries to make excuses for his behavior by pretending that he didn't know anything about who was on the phone, but she tells him that he stepped way over the line; she doesn't know that she can protect him anymore. The person he tried to call (the mystery woman) is not amused. The driver pulls over and throws them out after Wilhelmina begins insulting him for getting lost (After all, she did say "Take the side streets"). She left her bag in the back of the cab and now they're stranded. They walk the streets and ask some prostitutes for cash. The prostitutes start feeling up Wilhelmina's fur and she tries to talk slang to them but fails abysmally. Marc pretends to be her pimp (he calls Wilhelmina "Lil' Kim") and ushers her off before the girls can go for their knives. They later end up in a church, where Wilhelmina complains how she can't do her job anymore because she has to look after Daniel all the time but then lets slip her plot to take over Meade Publications, thus giving Marc an idea to guarantee his future. They rob the poor box for cab fare but Wilhelmina leaves a diamond earring in return.

At the Suarez house, Santos tries to get Justin to come out and play football, to get away from the glamour, to be a 'normal kid', only to see this picture perfect family moment come apart when Hilda and Santos begin arguing. She's comfortable with who Justin is and so is Justin. She says that Santos has no business telling her how to raise their son, after having walked out on them three years earlier. Upset, Santos says 'adios' and walks out. Daniel stays with Justin making ornaments as they decorate the tree. He apologizes to Ignacio for stepping in all day, yet Ignacio thanks him, telling him that he'll make a good father.

Later on at MODE, Betty tries to create a concept; she's going to portray Tim and Chloe as a 21st Century Adam and Eve in a jungle setting. She calls Daniel with her idea, but he says that she should bring Tim and Chloe to her house for the shoot. Betty goes to the elevator and Sofia is there. Betty asks her for a ride back to her house. They arrive at the Suarezes' and Betty tells Sofia that she needs to tell Daniel that the next time Sofia sees him, she'll be someone's wife.

After escaping a harrowing experience known as the seedy part of Queens, Wilhelmina and Marc return to the office and she's outraged the shoot has been moved to Queens. She gets a call from her mysterious friend, saying that she's an old friend from college. Realizing an opportunity after finding out that Wilhelmina never went to college, Marc says that they don't have any secrets anymore; he wants job security and a company credit card in exchange for keeping her secret. Marc also told Amanda that she was off the hook, but "...it would cost her."

Inside Betty's house, everything is prepared as Ignacio and Daniel look out the window. Daniel asks him how to say 'I love you and can't live without you' in Spanish. Ignacio tells him, then wishes him luck. Outside, Sofia tells Betty that she's wasting her life at MODE: She should come and work for her. Betty doesn't know what to say. She goes inside and tells Daniel he should talk to Sofia before she leaves. In the snow, he tells her that he comes from a very messed up family and asks for one more chance before he bungles a Spanish declaration of love, although he messes up and says 'I love my camera' instead. He gives her an ornament he made and asks her to pick out a tree with him. They kiss.

Back inside, Daniel tells Betty that he convinced Sofia to stay and tells her to take the job she offered; he doesn't want to get in her way, she deserves more. She hugs him. After he leaves, the family talks about how exciting it all was and how Betty just got another job offer. But the celebration takes a serious turn for the worse for the Suarezes when the doorbell rings and two immigration officers come to inform Ignacio that he is under arrest while the family is celebrating in the living room.

Reception
Entertainment Weekly's Michaeal Sleazak gave the episode a great review by noting, "Speaking of holiday treats, I don't even know where to start with this episode, arguably the funniest in Betty's short, punch-line-filled run. Wilhelmina and Marc stranded in the boroughs? Hilda and Daniel defending Justin's freedom of fabulousness? Betty doing battle with an out-of-control stylist? Baby Chutney? The amazing thing about Ugly Betty is that its large cast of characters contains no weak links — well, except for Walter, and let's give thanks he had the night off."

Ratings
"Lose the Boss" would be the lowest-rated Ugly Betty episode of the first season, coming in 48th with only 8.74 million viewers in the United States tuning in.

References

Also starring
Kevin Alejandro (Santos)        
Salma Hayek (Sofia Reyes)

Guest stars
Isaac Mizrahi (Himself)

Ugly Betty (season 1) episodes
2006 American television episodes